Wangcheng was an ancient Chinese city located beside the ceremonial eastern capital of Luoyi during the Zhou dynasty. It was constructed in 1021BC on the model of the earlier and larger Chengzhou  to its east. It was the primary capital of the Eastern Zhou dynasty between 771 and 510BC.

The Eastern Han dynasty also chose the location in AD25 as the site of its capital Luoyang, which was built over the earlier Zhou city. The ruins of Wangcheng have been partially excavated and are visible in modern Luoyang's Wangcheng Park.

References

Ancient Chinese cities
11th-century BC establishments in China
History of Luoyang